The Waterloo Cup was a coursing event organised by the National Coursing Club. The three-day event was run annually at Great Altcar in Lancashire, England from 1836 to 2005 and it used to attract tens of thousands of spectators to watch and gamble on the coursing matches. It was founded by The 2nd Earl of Sefton and, originally, was supported by his patronage.

It was the biggest annual hare coursing event in the United Kingdom and was often referred to by its supporters as the blue riband event of the coursing year. A hare coursing event of identical name was held in Australia from 1868 to 1985, at which point it became a lure coursing event.

Run as a knock-out tournament between sixty four coursing greyhounds from Great Britain and Ireland, supporters described it as the ultimate test of a greyhound but opponents of hare coursing, such as the League Against Cruel Sports, saw it as a celebration of cruelty. The Hunting Act 2004, which came into force just after the 2005 cup, made hare coursing events illegal in England and Wales, and the Waterloo Cup has not taken place since.

History

The Waterloo Cup was the premier event in the coursing calendar and known as the 'blue ribbon of the leash'. It was inaugurated in 1836 by Mr William Lynn, proprietor of the Waterloo Hotel in Liverpool's Ranelagh Street. Encouraged by the extra trade generated by the Waterloo Cup, the Liverpool entrepreneur turned his attention to the Turf the following year and organised the first running of the Grand Liverpool Steeplechase, known as the Grand National since 1839.

The first winner of the Waterloo Cup was a bitch named Milanie, owned by Lord Molyneux, the eldest son of the Earl of Sefton on whose land the contest was run on the plains of Altcar. In addition to stakes of £16, Lord Molyneux won a trophy in the form of a silver snuff box.

The first supreme champion in the sport of coursing was Lord Lurgan's greyhound Master McGrath who won the Waterloo Cup on three occasions, 1868, 1869 & 1871. The dog became a household name in Britain and such was his fame that Queen Victoria commanded his appearance at Windsor Castle. Master McGrath set the standard by which all proceeding greyhounds would be judged. The great Master McGrath's record was finally eclipsed by Colonel North's greyhound "Fullerton" who recorded four consecutive victories in the Waterloo Cup between 1889 and 1892. 

In later years the event has been championed by Newmarket trainer Sir Mark Prescott.

The 2005 event, held on 1416 February, was eventually won by a dog called Shashi, bred by Ernest Smith, and owned by him with Albert Shackcloth and Michael Darnell. Trained at Malton, North Yorkshire by the Jonathan Teal, the winner beat Hardy Admiral, owned by Diana Williams, in the final. The event was memorably filmed by Paul Yule for the documentary The Last Waterloo Cup, subsequently shown on the BBC.

Past winners

 * Cup divided
 + Substituted event called the Victory Cup

See also
Master McGrath

References

Greyhound coursing competitions in the United Kingdom
1836 establishments in England
2005 disestablishments in England